Heidemann Glacier is a glacier,  long, originating close northwest of Mount Damm in the Queen Elizabeth Range of Antarctica and flowing east into Lowery Glacier. It was mapped by the United States Geological Survey from tellurometer surveys and Navy air photos, 1960–62, and was named by the Advisory Committee on Antarctic Names for Richard P. Heidemann, a United States Antarctic Research Program glaciologist at Roosevelt Island, 1962–63.

References

Glaciers of Shackleton Coast